Glubokoye is a rural locality (a selo) in Novolimanskoye Rural Settlement, Petropavlovsky District, Voronezh Oblast, Russia. The population was 228 as of 2010. There are 4 streets.

Geography 
Glubokoye is located 29 km south of Petropavlovka (the district's administrative centre) by road. Dedovka is the nearest rural locality.

References 

Rural localities in Petropavlovsky District, Voronezh Oblast